Fossarus macmurdensis is a species of sea snail, a marine gastropod mollusk in the family Planaxidae.

Description

Distribution

References

Planaxidae
Gastropods described in 1911